Wizard is a video game created in 1980 for the Atari Video Computer System (later renamed the Atari 2600) by Chris Crawford while working for Atari, Inc. The game was not advertised or released by Atari. Wizard uses a 2K ROM, the last Atari 2600 game developed by Atari with less than 4K. Wizard was eventually released as part of the Atari Flashback 2 package in 2005.

Gameplay

The player is a wizard from Irata (Atari spelled backwards) and battles imps in a maze. It's not a symmetric battle: the player is faster than the enemy, but the enemy can go through walls and fire faster than the player can. There is no need to aim, as the angle of the player's fire is automatically sent in the direction of the enemy. The enemy remains invisible when it is behind a wall. It also has heart beat audio, which becomes louder as the player gets closer to the enemy.

Development
The production of Wizard is detailed extensively in the book Chris Crawford on Game Design. Crawford wanted to write software for the new Atari home computers, but Atari management required developers for the system to create an Atari VCS game first.

Wizard was never published for the Atari VCS. It was included with the Atari Flashback 2, 25 years after it was written. Chris Crawford learned about the release in an email from a fan. Crawford's original prototype did not contain a two-player mode, but the game released with the Atari Flashback 2 does.

References

External links
The Wizard Game Manual

2005 video games
Atari games
Cancelled Atari 2600 games
Atari 2600 games
Maze games
Chris Crawford (game designer) games
Video games developed in the United States